Roger L. Shinn (January 6, 1917 - May 13, 2013) was an American theologian. He was a dean and acting president of the Union Theological Seminary, and the author of many books.

Works
 Christianity and the Problem of History (New York; Scribner, 1953)

References

1917 births
2013 deaths
People from Germantown, Ohio
People from Southbury, Connecticut
Heidelberg University alumni
Union Theological Seminary (New York City) alumni
Union Theological Seminary (New York City) faculty